Mike Exeter is an English sound engineer and record producer who came to prominence via his work with British rock bands Cradle of Filth, Judas Priest Black Sabbath and more.

He is also known for his work with the British guitar player Tony Iommi, being his longstanding creative studio partner.

In 2013 he received a Grammy for his work on the Black Sabbath album 13.

Discography 

The Specials
 1995 - Hypocrite (Engineer)
Ruby Turner
 1996 - Guilty (Engineer)
Cradle of Filth
 1996 - Dusk and Her Embrace (Engineer, keyboards)
 1998 – Cruelty and the Beast (Producer)
 1999 – From the Cradle to Enslave (Engineer, mixer)
 2002 – Lovecraft & Witch Hearts (Remixing)
 2006 – The Cradle of Filth Box Set (Producer, Remixing)
UB40
 1997 - Guns In The Ghetto (Engineer)
Tony Iommi
 2004 - The 1996 DEP Sessions (Engineer, Audio Engineering, Main Personnel, Keyboards)
 2005 - Fused (Engineer, Programming)
Crown of Thorns
 2005 - Crown Jewels (Engineer)
Ian Gillan
 2006 - Gillan’s Inn (Engineer, Guitar Engineer)
Black Sabbath
 2007 - The Dio Years (Engineer, mixing)
 2013 - 13 (Engineer)
 2017 - The End DVD (Mixing, Mastering)
 2017 - The End (Mixing, Mastering)
Jeff Beck
 2007 - Official Bootleg USA ‘06 (Mastering)
Girlschool
 2008 - Legacy (Engineer)
Various Artists
 2008 - Heavy Metal Xmas & a Headbanging New Year (Engineer)
Heaven & Hell
 2009 - The Devil You Know (Producer, Engineer, Audio Engineer)
Sonic Altar
 2010 - No Sacrifice (Producer, Engineer, Mixing, Keyboards)
WhoCares
 2010 - Out of My Mind (Engineer, Mixing)
Judas Priest
 2014 - Redeemer of Souls (Producer, Mixer)
 2018 – Firepower (Engineer)
Snakecharmer
 2017 - Second Skin (Mixing, Mastering))
Those Damn Crows
 2018 - Murder & The Motive (Additional production)
Massive Wagons
 2018 - Full Nelson (Co-writer of song 'Robot' with additional production)
Dark Embrace
 2023 - Dark Heavy Metal (Mixing, Mastering)

References
Official Website https://www.mikeexeter.com

Living people
English record producers
British audio engineers
Place of birth missing (living people)
Year of birth missing (living people)